Julie Courtney Sullivan (born 1982), better known as J. Courtney Sullivan, is an American novelist and former writer for The New York Times.

Biography
Sullivan grew up outside Boston, Massachusetts. She attended Smith College in Northampton, Massachusetts, where she majored in Victorian literature and received the Ellen M. Hatfield Memorial Prize for best short story, the Norma M. Leas prize for excellence in written English, and the Jeanne MacFarland Prize for excellent work in Women's Studies.

She graduated in 2003, then moved to New York City and began working at Allure. Sullivan later moved to The New York Times, where she worked for four years. Her writing has since appeared in The New York Times Book Review, the Chicago Tribune, New York magazine, the New York Observer, Men's Vogue, Elle, and Glamour, among many others.

Sullivan comes from an Irish-Catholic family where many of the women go by their middle rather than first names. Her first piece for Allure was published under the name "Courtney Sullivan," but she added the J back in shortly thereafter.

She self-identifies as a feminist, a stance that has been reflected in both her fiction and nonfiction work. In 2006, she wrote a piece for the New York Times "Modern Love" column about her experiences in the dating world, and in 2010 she co-edited a feminist essay collection titled Click: When We Knew We Were Feminists. Her novels deal prominently with relationships between female characters. In 2017, Sullivan wrote the foreword to a new edition of one of her childhood favorites, Anne of Green Gables, published by Penguin Classics.

Sullivan lives with her husband, Kevin Johannesen, and their son, in Carroll Gardens, Brooklyn. She was raised Roman Catholic. She now considers herself a "lapsed Catholic" but still prays and visits an abbey on retreats.

Novels

Commencement
In 2010, Sullivan published her first novel, Commencement, which focuses on the experiences of four friends at Smith College, Sullivan's alma mater. She wrote 15 different drafts of the book before sending it to her editor, after which it underwent two or three more revisions.

Commencement received positive reviews from many major publications and became a New York Times bestseller. Feminist icon Gloria Steinem described the novel as "generous-hearted, brave...Commencement makes clear that the feminist revolution is just beginning".

In 2011, Oprah's Book Club included Commencement in a list of "5 Feminist Classics to (Re)read as a Mom, Wife and Writer".

Maine
Sullivan's second novel, Maine, deals with four women from three different generations of an Irish family named the Kellehers. The foursome includes: Alice, the stubborn and opinionated matriarch who is dealing with the guilt she has over a tragedy in the past; Ann Marie, who married into the family and is nursing her newfound love for creating dollhouses; Katherine, Alice's eldest daughter who has commuted from California to be with her daughter, Maggie; and Maggie, a kindhearted 32-year-old from New York who is dealing with her pregnancy. Each woman's world collides while spending the summer at a beachfront cottage in New England. Though Sullivan did not base the fictional family directly on her own Irish-Catholic family, she drew on her own childhood experiences while writing the novel.

Maine was named a Best Book of the Year by the Washington Post and one of the top ten fiction books of 2011 by TIME magazine. It was a New York Times bestseller, and has sold half a million copies since its publication.

The Engagements
Evelyn has been married to her husband for forty years—forty years since he slipped off her first wedding ring and put his own in its place. Delphine has seen both sides of love—the ecstatic, glorious highs of seduction, and the bitter, spiteful fury that descends when it's over. James, a paramedic who works the night shift, knows his wife's family thinks she could have done better; while Kate, partnered with Dan for a decade, has seen every kind of wedding—beach weddings, backyard weddings, castle weddings—and has vowed never, ever, to have one of her own. As these lives and marriages unfold in surprising ways, we meet Frances Gerety, a young advertising copywriter in 1947. Frances is working on the De Beers campaign and she needs a signature line, so, one night before bed, she scribbles a phrase on a scrap of paper: "A Diamond Is Forever." And that line changes everything.

Reese Witherspoon's production company picked up the rights to The Engagements before the book was even published. Fox 2000 signed on to make the film soon thereafter. The Engagements was a New York Times bestseller, and was named a best book of the year by People Magazine and the Irish Times. It has been published in 17 countries.

Saints For All Occasions 
Sullivan's fourth novel was named one of the ten best books of the year by the Washington Post, a New York Times Critic's Pick for 2017 and was a finalist for the New England Book Award. Richard Russo said, "I hope to read another novel as strong and wise and beautiful and heartbreaking as Saints For All Occasions this year, but I'm not sure I will."

Books

Fiction
Commencement (2010)
Maine (2011)
The Engagements (2013)
Saints for All Occasions (2017)
Friends and Strangers (2020)

Nonfiction

The Secret Currency of Love (2009) (contributing essayist)
Click: When We Knew We Were Feminists (2010) (co-editor with Courtney E. Martin)
Foreword to the classic novel Anne of Green Gables (2017)

References

External links 
 
Girls Write Now
GEMS: Girls Educational and Mentoring Services
Articles about Sullivan
Julie Bosman. "Brunch and TV, But Still a Workday." New York Times. May 27, 2011. MB2.
Heather Schwedel. "Exclusive: An Interview with Commencement's J. Courtney Sullivan." June 16, 2009. Flavorwire.
Emma Shakarshy. One Young Writer's Commencement: An Interview With J. Courtney Sullivan. August 5, 2009. Girls Write Now.

Reviews of Sullivan's books
Lily King. "Permanent Waves." New York Times Book Review. June 10, 2011. BR16. Review of Maine.
Stephan Lee. "Jennifer Close, J. Courtney Sullivan, Sloane Crosley: Chick authors who avoid the 'chick-lit' stigma." September 19, 2011.
Maria Russo. "B.F.'s Forever." New York Times. June 12, 2009. BR8. Review of Commencement.
Elizabeth Taylor. Review of Maine. July 1, 2011.

1982 births
Living people
20th-century Roman Catholics
21st-century American novelists
21st-century American women writers
21st-century Roman Catholics
American women novelists
Chicago Tribune people
New York (magazine) people
The New York Observer people
The New York Times writers
Novelists from Massachusetts
People from Park Slope
Smith College alumni
Novelists from New York (state)
Catholics from New York (state)